Panicum mosaic satellite virus (SPMV) is a plant satellite virus in genus Papanivirus, which is a member of realm Riboviria without assigned family or order. It only infects grasses which are infected by Panicum mosaic virus.  One study found that 72% of Stenotaphrum secundatum (St Augustine grass) infected with panicum mosaic virus was also infected with SPMV.  In addition to SPMV, many plants infected with panicum mosaic virus are also infected with satellite RNAs.

References

External links
ICTVdB—The Universal Virus Database: Panicum mosaic satellite virus
Family Groups—The Baltimore Method
Mart Krupovic: Plant Satellite Viruses (Albetovirus, Aumaivirus, Papanivirus, Virtovirus) (PDF}. In: Reference Module in Life Sciences. Jan 2020. doi:10.1016/B978-0-12-809633-8.21289-2. ResearchGate.
SIB: Papanivirus. Expasy ViralZone

Viral plant pathogens and diseases
Satellite viruses
Positive-sense single-stranded RNA viruses